Quy Joq (also Romanized as Qūy Joq and Qūyjeq) is a village in Tamran Rural District, in the Central District of Kalaleh County, Golestan Province, Iran. At the 2006 census, its population was 211, in 45 families.

References 

Populated places in Kalaleh County